Thomas Molyneux (December 5, 1890 – February 21, 1955) was an English born Canadian professional ice hockey player. He played with the Toronto Shamrocks of the National Hockey Association. He also played with the Sherbrooke Saints in Sherbrooke, Quebec.

Molyneux is buried at Greenwood Cemetery in Waterville, Quebec.

References

External links
Tom Molyneux at JustSportsStats

19th-century births
1955 deaths
Canadian ice hockey forwards
English emigrants to Canada
Sportspeople from Barrow-in-Furness
Toronto Shamrocks players